Neon, Kentucky may refer to:
Neon, Letcher County, Kentucky
Fleming-Neon, Kentucky, also known simply as Neon